William Barry (1872–1929) was an Irish-born Roman Catholic priest who served as Archbishop of Hobart, Tasmania.

Born in 1872, in Midleton, Co. Cork, he was educated locally by the Christian Brothers and at St Colman's College, Fermoy. In 1892 he entered All Hallows College, Dublin to train as a missionary priest. He was ordained in 1898, and posted to the Archdiocese of Sydney, by Cardinal Moran, where he worked at St. Mary's Cathedral.

In 1919 he was appointed co-adjutor bishop of Hobart. Dr. Barry succeeded Archbishop Delany in 1926, to the see of Hobart.

He died on 13 June 1929; he was succeeded by Kilkenny-born and Rome-educated William Hayden.

Archbishop Barry was one of four brothers who became priests, including his brother Rt. Rev. John Barry was also priest and bishop who served in Australia. When appointed to Hobart in 1919, William Barry was succeeded by his brother Tom Barry as parish priest.

References

Roman Catholic archbishops of Hobart
20th-century Roman Catholic archbishops in Australia
People from County Cork
1872 births
1929 deaths
Alumni of All Hallows College, Dublin
People educated at St Colman's College, Fermoy
Irish expatriate Catholic bishops
Irish expatriates in Australia